The Ipotești–Cândești culture was an archaeological culture in Eastern Europe. It developed in the mid-6th century by the merger of elements of the Prague-Penkovka and Prague-Korchak cultures and local cultures (including Germanic) in the area between Prut and Lower Danube. It stretched in the Lower Danube over territory in Romania and Moldova. The population of the area was made up of germanic (mostly gothic), and Slavic tribes. There are views that it derived from the Chernyakhov culture and represented a group of the Antes. The houses were identical to the Slavic huts of the Prague-Korchak and Penkovka areas. The sites in Romania are known as Ipotești-Candești-Ciurel or Ipotești-Ciurel-Cândești.

References

Sources

Further reading
 Teodorescu, V., 1966. La civilisation Ipotești Cândești (Ve-VIIe siècles de. ne). Actes du VIIe Congrès International des Sciences Préhistoriques et Protohistoriques. Prague, pp. 21–27.
 Teodor, E.S., 2004. Un Update for "Ipotești-Cândești culture". Zborník na počest. Dariny Bialekovej (Nitra: SAV), pp. 405–414.

6th century in Europe
History of the Romanians
Romania in the Early Middle Ages
Dacians
Germanic archaeological cultures
Early Slavic archaeology
East Slavic history
Early medieval archaeological cultures of Europe
Archaeological cultures in Moldova
Archaeological cultures in Romania
Archaeological cultures in Ukraine